Dr. Lynne Austin Bentley-Kemp (born 1952) is an American fine arts photographer, photography educator, and researcher. Prior to becoming professor of photography at Florida Keys Community College,(now College of the Florida Keys)was an associate professor at Rochester Institute of Technology. She holds a Ph.D. from Florida Atlantic University (2003). Bentley-Kemp has researched the act of collecting photos. Her work includes the 34 black-and-white infrared photographs series entitled, Windows to the Sun. Most recently she has designed three illustrated books and exhibited a solo show of iPhone images titled ‘Atmospheric Conditions’ at the Studios of Key West in 2020. She was married to the educator, Weston D. Kemp until his death in 2019.

See also
 List of women photographers

References

External links
 Official website

1952 births
American photographers
American women photographers
Rochester Institute of Technology faculty
Florida Atlantic University alumni
Living people
American women academics
21st-century American women